South Carolina Highway 172 (SC 172) is a  state highway in the U.S. state of South Carolina. The highway travels through rural areas of Orangeburg and Calhoun counties.

Route description
SC 172 begins at an intersection with U.S. Route 178 (US 178; North Road) east-northeast of North, within Orangeburg County. It travels to the north-northeast. Approximately  later, it meets the eastern terminus of SC 692, with SC 172 heading to the east-northeast before it enters Calhoun County. It passes by the Do-Little Field airport just before it meets US 21 (Columbia Road). SC 172 continues another  to end at SC 6 (Caw Caw Road).

Major intersections

See also

References

External links

SC 172 at Virginia Highways' South Carolina Highways Annex

172
Transportation in Orangeburg County, South Carolina
Transportation in Calhoun County, South Carolina